A. dauci may refer to:

Alicyclobacillus dauci, a Gram-positive bacterium
Alternaria dauci, a fungus that causes carrot leaf blight